The 1985 Texas Tech Red Raiders football team represented Texas Tech University as a member of the Southwest Conference (SWC) during the 1985 NCAA Division I-A football season. In their fifth and final season under head coach Jerry Moore, the Red Raiders compiled a 4–7 record (1–7 against SWC opponents), outscored opponents by a combined total of 249 to 240 (largely on the strength of a 63-7 victory over TCU), and finished in eighth place in the conference. The team played its home games at Clifford B. and Audrey Jones Stadium in Lubbock, Texas.

Schedule

References

Texas Tech
Texas Tech Red Raiders football seasons
Texas Tech Red Raiders football